OBL or ÖBL may refer to:

Basketball
 Obol Basketball League, former name for the Swedish Basketball League
 Österreichische Basketball Bundesliga, the top basketball league in Austria

Other
 Osama bin Laden (1957–2011), founder of the al-Qaeda militant organization
 Zoersel-Oostmalle Airfield, Belgium (IATA code) 
 Oblique case, a grammatical case
 Obligate wetland plant, a wetland indicator status
 Österreichisches Biographisches Lexikon 1815–1950, a biographical dictionary of individuals who've contributed to the history of Austria
 One Bank Limited, a Bangladeshi bank
 Oblo language of northern Cameroon (ISO 639-3 code: obl)